Malvern Hills District Council elections are held every four years. Malvern Hills District Council is the local authority for the non-metropolitan district of Malvern Hills in Worcestershire, England. Since the last boundary changes in 2003, 38 councillors have been elected from 22 wards.

Political control
The first election to the council was held in 1973, initially operating as a shadow authority until it came into its powers on 1 April 1974. A shadow authority was again elected in 1997 ahead of the significant district boundary changes which came into effect on 1 April 1998, when the upper-tier authority for the district also changed from being Hereford and Worcester County Council (which was abolished) to the re-established Worcestershire County Council. Political control of the district council since 1974 has been held by the following parties:

Leadership
The leaders of the council since 2000 have been:

Council elections
1973 Malvern Hills District Council election
1976 Malvern Hills District Council election
1979 Malvern Hills District Council election (New ward boundaries)
1983 Malvern Hills District Council election
1987 Malvern Hills District Council election (District boundary changes took place but the number of seats remained the same)
1991 Malvern Hills District Council election
1995 Malvern Hills District Council election
1997 Malvern Hills District Council election (Elections to shadow authority on new boundaries, councillors took office on 1 April 1998)
2000 Malvern Hills District Council election
2003 Malvern Hills District Council election (New ward boundaries reduced the number of seats by 4)
2007 Malvern Hills District Council election
2011 Malvern Hills District Council election
2015 Malvern Hills District Council election
2019 Malvern Hills District Council election

By-election results

1995-1997

1997-2000

2000-2003

2003-2007

2007-2011

2011-2015

2015-2019

2019-2023

References

 By-election results

External links
Malvern Hills District Council

 
Malvern Hills District
Council elections in Worcestershire
District council elections in England
Council elections in Hereford and Worcester